Carl Froch vs. Jermain Taylor was a boxing super-middleweight fight between the newly crowned champion Carl Froch and former Undisputed middleweight champion Jermain Taylor. The fight was held at the Foxwoods Resort Casino in Ledyard, Connecticut, United States on April 25, 2009.

Build-up
Froch was coming off a win against Jean Pascal for the vacant WBC title whilst Jermain Taylor had only recently stepped up to super-middleweight and was also coming off a win, beating Jeff Lacy in a title eliminator. Froch was ranked lower in the Ring Magazine rankings despite being the champion and was fighting in the United States for only the second time in his career.

Result
A barrage of punches by Froch caused the referee to stop the fight with fourteen seconds remaining in Round 12, the final round, giving Froch the win by KO and retention of his WBC super middleweight title.

See also
Super Six World Boxing Classic

References

Boxing matches
2009 in boxing
Boxing in Connecticut
Sports in Ledyard, Connecticut
2009 in sports in Connecticut
April 2009 sports events in the United States
Boxing on Showtime